The Samoan pipefish, or brown pipefish (Halicampus mataafae), is a species of marine fish of the family Syngnathidae. It is a solitary species with cryptic habits and is rarely observed. This species is ovoviviparous, with males carrying the fertilised eggs in a brood pouch, the folds of which fall well short of the centre of the egg-filled pouch, eventually giving birth to live young.

Etymology
The specific name honours Mataafa, a former king of Samoa. It is a listed marine species under the Australian Environment Protection and Biodiversity Conservation Act 1999.

Identification

H. mataafae can be identified by its reddish-brown colouring and small pale spots on its trunk and tail.

References

Further
Encyclopedia of Life
iSeahorse
IUCN Seahorse, Pipefish & Stickleback Specialist Group

Taxa named by David Starr Jordan
Taxa named by Alvin Seale
Fish described in 1906
mataafae
Marine fish